The Solihull Metropolitan Borough Council elections were held on Thursday, 3 May 1984, with one third of the council to be elected and a double vacancy in Shirley West. The Conservatives retained control of the council. Voter turnout was 35.2%

Election result

|- style="background-color:#F9F9F9"
! style="background-color: " |
| Independent Ratepayers & Residents 
| align="right" | 2
| align="right" | 0
| align="right" | 0
| align="right" | 0
| align="right" | 11.1
| align="right" | 8.1
| align="right" | 4,285
| align="right" | 
|-

|- style="background-color:#F9F9F9"
! style="background-color: " |
| Traditional Labour
| align="right" | 0
| align="right" | 0
| align="right" | 0
| align="right" | 0
| align="right" | 0.0
| align="right" | 0.8
| align="right" | 441
| align="right" | 
|-

This result had the following consequences for the total number of seats on the council after the elections:

Ward results

|- style="background-color:#F9F9F9"
! style="background-color: " |
| Traditional Labour
| James O'Callaghan
| align="right" | 441
| align="right" | 22.2
| align="right" | 
|-

References

1984 English local elections
1984
1980s in the West Midlands (county)
May 1984 events in the United Kingdom